Events in the year 2011 in Romania.

Incumbents
President: Traian Băsescu
Prime Minister: Emil Boc

Events
 17 April – Action 2012, a coalition of organizations supporting unification between Moldova and Romania, is founded.
 October 20–31 – 2011 Romanian census

Arts and entertainment
In music: Romania in the Eurovision Song Contest 2011, List of Romanian Top 100 top 10 singles in 2011.

Sports
Football (soccer) competitions: Liga I, Liga II, Cupa României (Final). Romania hosted the 2011 UEFA European Under-19 Football Championship.

In ice hockey: MOL Liga season.

Deaths

January
 January 1 – Constantin Marin, 85, musician, conductor, and composer (born 1925)
 January 10 – Liana Alexandra, 63, composer, pianist, and music educator (born 1947).
 January 18 – Cristian Pațurcă, 46, composer (born 1964)
 January 19 – Mihai Ionescu, 74, footballer (born 1936)
 January 27 – Liana Dumitrescu, 38, politician (born 1973)
 January 31 – Bartolomeu Anania, 89, Romanian Orthodox bishop, Metropolitan of Cluj, Alba, Crișana and Maramureș (born 1921)

December
 December 1 – Andrei Blaier, 78, film director and screenwriter (born 1933)

See also
 
2011 in the European Union
2011 in Europe
Romania in the Eurovision Song Contest 2011
List of 2011 box office number-one films in Romania

References

External links

 
2010s in Romania
Romania
Romania
Years of the 21st century in Romania